An elemental is a type of magical entity who personifies a force of nature and controls natural powers derived from their element. 

Elemental may also refer to:

People with the name
 Professor Elemental, steampunk hip-hop artist

Arts, entertainment, and media

Comics and literature
 "Elemental" (story), a 1984 story by Geoffrey A. Landis
 Elementals (Comico Comics), an American superhero comic book by Bill Willingham
 Elementals (comics), a number of different comics titles and characters of the same name
 The Elementals, a 1981 novel by Michael McDowell.

Fictional entities
 Elemental (Dungeons & Dragons), a type of creature from the role-playing game (clearly based on the alchemical creature)
 Elemental (The Chronicles of Riddick), a fictional race that evolved from humans in the film The Chronicles of Riddick
 Elemental, a type of power armor used by the Clans in the BattleTech franchise
 Elemental, a species in the Mortal Kombat game universe
 Elementals (Crash Bandicoot), a group of renegade masks from the video game Crash Bandicoot: The Wrath of Cortex
 Elementals (Marvel Comics), a fictional organization in the Marvel Universe

Games
 Elemental (video game), a 1988 action-strategy video game by Erick Dupuis
 Elemental: War of Magic, a 2010 turn-based strategy video game by Stardock

Music
 Elemental (Cesium 137 album), the second album from American band Cesium 137
 Elemental (Cobalt 60 album)
 Elemental (Loreena McKennitt album), a 1985 album by Canadian singer and harpist Loreena McKennitt
 Elemental (Demdike Stare album), 2012
 Elemental (Tears for Fears album), a 1993 album by British pop band Tears for Fears
 "Elemental" (song), the title track from that album
 Elemental (The Fixx album), a 1998 album by The Fixx
 "Elementals", a composition by Dave Brubeck for jazz combo and orchestra

Other uses in arts, entertainment, and media
 Elemental (2012 film), a 2012 film
 Elemental (2023 film), a 2023 animated film from Disney/Pixar
 Elemental (music group), a Croatian hip-hop group
 Elemental, a health and wellness website published by Medium

Other uses
 Elemental Technologies, Inc., a video software company in Portland, Oregon

See also
 Element (disambiguation)
 Elementary (disambiguation)